Marmara oregonensis is a moth of the family Gracillariidae. It is known from Oregon, United States.

The larvae feed on Abies grandis and Pseudotsuga menziesii. They mine the stem of their host plant. It mines the smooth bark surfaces. The mines are formed in the living periderm of the host causing superficial injury to the tree.

References

Gracillariinae
Moths described in 1975